Paanch Adhyay (lit. five chapters) is a 2012 Bengali romantic drama set in Kolkata. The film marks the Bengali language debut for Bollywood actress Dia Mirza. The film is written and directed by Pratim D. Gupta, the resident film critic of The Telegraph newspaper in Kolkata and produced by Kaustuv Roy. The music of the film has been scored by Shantanu Moitra. Besides a successful six-week run in Bengal, Paanch Adhyay was selected as the Centerpiece Premiere at the South Asian International Film Festival in New York and in the New Voice in Indian Cinema section at the Mumbai Film Festival. Paanch Adhyay also won the Best Film Award at the prestigious Kalakar Awards.

Plot 
Paanch Adhyay is the story of love found and lost in the lives of a contemporary Indian couple, told in moments past and present. Plunged into passion from the moment they meet in Kolkata, Arindam (Priyanshu Chatterjee) and Ishita's (Dia Mirza) different ideologies - towards life and art - push them apart.

Cast 
 Dia Mirza as Ishita Roy Chowdhury
 Priyanshu Chatterjee as Arindam Roy Chowdhury
 Sampurna Lahiri as Ranjabati Sen
 Anubrata Basu as Rajat
 Anindya Bannerjee as Suri
 Shibnath Dey as Kalyan
 Kaushal Kumbhat as Mr Mehta
 Seema Sapru as Principal
 Suman Mukhopadhyay as Dr. Bakshi
 Ritoban Das as Ad Assistant
 Neel Bhattacharya as Footballer
 Soumitra Chatterjee as Hrishi-da

Reception

Critical reception

Paanch Adhyay received overwhelmingly positive reviews from critics and filmmakers alike. Director Imtiaz Ali called the film "Bangla cinema's modern Charulata" and wrote "Wonderful lyrics and singing. Music strikes a quirky balance of a modern and traditional. Detailed and effective art work, thoughtful camera compositions and a rapid pace make the movie an emotional experience." Writing for Outlook, Dola Mitra gave it 3 out of 4 stars and wrote in her review – "The film begins promisingly, but falters midway, picks up momentum again and ends in a crescendo of emotions.". The Times of India gave Paanch Adhyay 3.5 stars praising the novel storytelling and the soulful music.

Soundtrack

The soundtrack of the film was composed by Shantanu Moitra, consisting of four Bengali songs written by Anindya Chatterjee & Chandril Bhattacharya, two Hindi songs written by Swanand Kirkire and one English song written by Pratim D. Gupta. Paanch Adhyay songs received high positive  reviews from critics and audience and the song Uda jaay was a high critical and commercial success.

References

External links 
 

2012 films
Bengali-language Indian films
2010s Bengali-language films
Films scored by Shantanu Moitra
Films directed by Pratim D. Gupta